Daniel Joseph Brennan, Baron Brennan,  (born 19 March 1942) is a British life peer and barrister.

Early life and background
Brennan was educated at St. Bede's Grammar School, Bradford, and graduated with a Bachelor of Law degree from Manchester University, where subsequently he was awarded an honorary Doctorate in 2000.

Career
He was called to the bar at Gray's Inn in 1967. A member of Matrix Chambers, he specialises in personal injury and medical work, commercial law, international business issues, public and private international law, and international arbitration. He became a Queen's Counsel in 1985, and he is a Deputy High Court Judge and a Recorder in the Crown Court, a former member of the Criminal Injuries Compensation Board and ex-Chairman of the Personal Injuries Bar Association.

Lord Brennan is the Bar representative on the Council of the International Bar Association. He is also a member of the bars of the Republic of Ireland and Northern Ireland. In 2000, The Lawyer Magazine described him as Barrister of the Year.

Lord Brennan is Chair of the APPG on Legal and Constitutional Affairs, which is a cross party grouping of MPs and Peers with Parliament focussed on discussing issues relating to the legal profession and the reform of the law and constitution.

He has an environmental, product liability and medical negligence practice involving multi-party actions such as the insurance claims from the Paddington rail crash, the combined oral contraceptive pill litigation and, in the past, the local residents' claims arising from the Canary Wharf development scheme, the HIV/haemophiliac claims against the UK government and the Herald of Free Enterprise disaster.  Most recently he has appeared in the 'designer baby' appeal in the House of Lords.

He was created Baron Brennan, of Bibury in the County of Gloucestershire on 2 May 2000 and is president of the Catholic Union of Great Britain. In 2006 Lord Brennan was appointed Delegate for Great Britain and Ireland of the Sacred Military Constantinian Order of Saint George in succession to Anthony Bailey.

On 19 November 2007 Brennan collapsed in the House of Lords shortly after concluding a speech on the Human Fertilisation and Embryology Bill. He was given heart massage in the House of Lords by, among others, Ara Darzi, Baron Darzi of Denham, the health minister. He had urged the creation of a National Bioethics Commission. Lord Brennan spent time recovering at St Thomas' Hospital, London.

On 3 December 2007 Lord Brennan again became unwell in the Chamber of the House of Lords.  Having been fitted with a pacemaker at St Thomas' Hospital, he was thanking peers and staff who had been involved in the occasion when he was last taken ill, when he fell back in his seat.

Personal life
In 1968 he married a Spanish national, Pilar Sánchez Moya, with whom he has four sons.

Affiliations
Lord Brennan is the chairman of the board of directors of the Washington-based think-tank Global Financial Integrity.

Arms

References

1942 births
Living people
Labour Party (UK) life peers 
Alumni of the University of Manchester
English King's Counsel
English barristers
Members of Gray's Inn
Members of Matrix Chambers
English Roman Catholics
Irish barristers
Members of the Bar of Northern Ireland
20th-century King's Counsel
People educated at St. Bede's Grammar School
Life peers created by Elizabeth II